Dimo's Apizza is a pizzeria in Portland, Oregon.

Description 

Dimo's Pizza is a pizzeria on East Burnside Street. The restaurant serves New Haven-style pizza from a coal-fired oven; varieties include tomato with garlic, cacio e pepe with black-pepper-pecorino cream, tomato confit, and zucchini, and clams with garlic, parsley, and chili flakes. 'The Father' has sausage and pickled peppers, and the 'Hail Mary' has soppressata, Calabrian chile, and Castelvetrano olives. The special called 'This Bacon Is Radicchio!' has bacon, radicchio, caramelized red onions, tomato confit, fontina, and thyme. 'The G.O.A.T.' had tomatoes, sweet summer corn, caramelized red onions, scamorza, goat cheese, parsley, mint, and basil.

In addition to pizzas, the restaurant also serves sandwiches, including chicken parmesan and roast beef on sesame baguettes. 'The Beast' has whole top sirloin seasoned like brisket, Gruyère, and aioli. Breakfast sandwiches have egg and cheese with bacon or Taylor ham on poppy seed hard rolls.

History 
Chef Doug Miriello opened Dimo's in July 2020, in a space which previously housed Burnside Brewing Company and the Danish brewery Mikkeller. Eater Portland's Brooke Jackson-Glidden described the restaurant, named after Miriello's grandmother, as "a new, outdoor, potentially permanent pizza pop-up". In 2021, Dimo's hosted a 420 event in collaboration with Oma's Hideaway and the cocktail pop-up Shipwreck. A special pizza included wood-roasted Chinese eggplant, tomato sambal, lemon, cumin yogurt, herbs, and fried garlic. Some proceeds from the event benefitted Last Prisoner Project, which "aims to rectify the harms of cannabis criminalization". Since April 2022, the restaurant also serves a 4-course dinner meal.

Reception 
Willamette Week included Dimo's in a list of "Five Great New Restaurants That Opened in 2020". Karen Brooks included Dimo's in Portland Monthly 2021 overview of the city's best restaurants and named the pizzeria as one of three which "bolster the case that Portland is America's best pizza city".

See also

 Pizza in Portland, Oregon

References

External links

 

2020 establishments in Oregon
Kerns, Portland, Oregon
Northeast Portland, Oregon
Pizzerias in Portland, Oregon
Restaurants established in 2020